Kremlingate may refer to:

 Bank Menatep, a 1990s scandal 
 Russian interference in the 2016 United States elections
 Links between Trump associates and Russian officials

See also
 Armorial Gate, a former monument at the Moscow Kremlin
 List of scandals with "-gate" suffix